The 1922 Open Championship was the 57th Open Championship, played 22–23 June at Royal St George's Golf Club in Sandwich, England. Walter Hagen became the first American-born winner of the Open Championship, one stroke ahead of runners-up Jim Barnes and George Duncan. It was the first of Hagen's four Open Championships and the fourth of his eleven major titles.

Qualifying took place on 19–20 June, Monday and Tuesday, with 18 holes at St. George's and 18 holes at  the top eighty and ties qualified. Hagen and Joe Kirkwood led the field on 147; the qualifying score was 161 and exactly 80 players advanced. Wednesday was an idle day, which included a driving contest.

Hagen, the winner over Barnes in the PGA Championship finals in 1921, was the 36-hole leader at 149, two strokes ahead of Duncan, Barnes, and five-time champion J.H. Taylor. In the two-day format, there was not a cut after 36 holes.

In the third round on Friday morning, defending champion Jock Hutchison shot 73 and moved to the lead, one shot ahead of Taylor and Jean Gassiat, and two shots over Hagen and Barnes. Despite a seven on the fourth hole, Hutchison carded a 36 on the front nine of the final round, but a 40 on the final nine led to a 76 and a fourth-place finish in his second and last Open.

Hagen and Barnes battled for the championship, but Barnes' 73 was one off Hagen's 72, his lowest round of the championship. Duncan, the 1920 champion, shot an 81 in the third round and fell six strokes back into a tie for tenth, then rebounded with a 69 in the afternoon to climb the leaderboard and tie Barnes for second. Taylor and Gassiat shot high scores in the final round and dropped to sixth and seventh, respectively.

For the final time, two members of the Great Triumvirate finished in the top-10 at the Open Championship; Taylor, age 51, finished sixth and six-time champion Harry Vardon, age 52, tied for eighth. The third member, James Braid, missed qualifying on Tuesday by a stroke.

Past champions in the field 

Source:

Did not advance past qualifying rounds (Monday & Tuesday):
James Braid (1901, 1905, 1906, 1908, 1910) 162.

Round summaries

First round
Thursday, 22 June 1922 (morning)

Source:

Second round
Thursday, 22 June 1922 (afternoon)

Source:

Third round
Friday, 23 June 1922 (morning)

Source:

Final round
Friday, 23 June 1922 (afternoon)

Source:

References

External links
Royal St George's 1922 (Official site)

The Open Championship
Golf tournaments in England
Open Championship
Open Championship
Open Championship